Read is a surname of English origins.

Derivation
The name is most likely to derive from rēad, the Anglo-Saxon (Old English) term for the colour red. As a name it is believed to have originally been descriptive of person's complexion or hair being ruddy or red. Old English had spelling variants depending on dialect, rēad was the form in West Saxon, rēid was the spelling characteristic of Northumbrian English. This variation is probably fossilised in the modern name variants, Read and Reid. There is a settlement in Lancashire called Read, the name deriving from an Old English term meaning roe[deer]-headland, this may also account for some Read surnames.

Historical use
As a personal name a grammatical form of Read, Reada, was used at the earliest stages of English history. The English town of Reading on the River Thames derives its name from a very early English tribal or community group called the Readingas. The Readingas appear to have been named after a chieftain called Reada, "The Red One," with the addition of the element -ingas meaning "the people of."  The first written use of the name is that of a Leofwine se Reade (Leofwine the Red), in the time of King Canute, dating to 1016–1020.  However, this usage would have been as a descriptive by-name as inherited family surnames had not yet become established. A variant spelling is found in the person of Godwin le Rede, recorded in Norfolk in 1273, and a Thomas Read is recorded in 1327; their use of the name would have been as a heritable surname. A Read family was prominent in early American history, George Read of Delaware was signatory to the Declaration of Independence and US Constitution.

People
This name is attributed to these notable figures and is included in the names of the following articles:

Politics and government
 Almon Heath Read (1790–1844), lawyer and U.S. Representative from Pennsylvania
 George Read (Alberta politician), politician and party leader from Alberta
 George Read (Ontario politician), (1819 – after 1874), businessman and Member of Parliament from Ontario
 George Read (U.S. statesman) (1733–1798), lawyer, signer of Declaration of Independence and U.S. Senator  from Delaware
 George Read, Jr. (1765–1836), lawyer, son of George Read, Sr., U.S. Attorney for the state of Delaware
 Jacob Read (1752–1816), lawyer and U.S. Senator from South Carolina
 John Erskine Read (1888–1973), lawyer and international jurist from Canada
 John Kingsley Read (1937–1985), politician from the United Kingdom
 John Milton Read (1842–1881), American politician
 John M. Read (1797–1874), lawyer and jurist from Pennsylvania
 Mel Read, politician and member of the E.U. Parliament from the United Kingdom
 Nathan Read (1759–1849), teacher and U.S. Representative from Massachusetts
William T. Read (1878–1954), lawyer, President of the New Jersey Senate, and Treasurer of New Jersey

Military and naval
 Abner Read (1821–1863), U.S. naval officer
 Albert Cushing Read (1887–1967), aviator and U.S. naval admiral
 Anketell M. Read (1884–1915), English recipient of the Victoria Cross
 Charles Read (1840–1890), U.S. and Confederate naval officer
 George C. Read, (1788–1862), sailor and American Rear-Admiral
 George E. Read, (1838–1910), sailor and American Medal of Honor recipient

Entertainment
 Al Read (1909–1987), English comedian
 Anthony Read, English scriptwriter and editor
 Howard Read, British comedian
 James Read (born 1953), American television actor
 John D. Read, English singer-songwriter
 Mike Read (born 1951), British disc jockey and TV presenter

Academics and literature
 Allen W. Read (1906–2002), American etymologist and lexicographer
 Benedict Read (born 1945), English art historian
 Chopper Read (1954–2013), Australian criminal and author
 Conyers Read (1881–1959), American historian
 Daniel Read (1757–1836), American composer
 Elizabeth Fisher Read (1872–1943), scholar and Women's Suffrage activist
 Florence M. Read, college president
 Gardner Read (1913–2005), American composer
 Sir Herbert Read (1893–1968), English poet
 Sir Hercules Read(1857–1929), British archaeologist and curator at the British Museum 
 Jane Maria Read (1853–?), American poet, artist, teacher
 Leonard Read (1898–1983), American think tank founder
 Miss Read (1913–2012) the pen name of Dora Jessie Saint (from her mother's maiden name), British author
 Opie Read (1852–1939), American journalist and humorist
 Piers P. Read (born 1941), British novelist and non-fiction author
 Ronald K. Read (1887–1975) English developer of Quikscript, an alphabet
 Richard Read (born 1957), American journalist
 Thomas B. Read (1822–1872), American poet

Business and industry
 Ian Read, executive for Pfizer
 Nic Read, executive in business, publishing and education

Science and technology
 Carveth Read (1848–1931), British philosopher and logician
 Charles Read (1958–2015), British mathematician
 Herbert Harold Read (1889–1970), British geologist

Sports
 Charles Read (squash player) (fl. 1920s), English
 Chris Read (born 1978), English cricketer
 Glen Read (born 1981), English cricketer
 Hopper Read (1910–2000), English cricketer
 Ken Read (born 1955), Canadian skier
 Kieran Read (born 1985), New Zealand rugby player
 Leilani Read (1973–1999), New Zealand and Samoan netball player
 Matt Read (born 1986), Canadian hockey player 
 Maurice Read (1859–1929), English cricketer
 Phil Read (1939–2022), English motorcycle racer
 Reg Read (1886–1974), New Zealand cricketer
 Tommy Read, English footballer
 Trevor Read (born 1980), Canadian ice hockey defenceman
 Walter Read (1855–1907), English cricketer

Other
 Blue Tulip Rose Read, English stalker
 Deborah Read (1708–1774), the wife of Benjamin Franklin
 Gabriel Read, Australian gold prospector
 John D. Read (1814–1864), American abolitionist
 Mary Read (c. 1690–1721), English pirate
 Nicholas Read (sculptor) (d.1787) English sculptor
 Read, the family surname of the titular character in Arthur

Disambiguation
 Alexander Read (disambiguation)

See also
 Red (nickname)
 Redd (given name)
 Redd (surname)
 Reade (name), given name and surname
 Rhead
 Reed (name)
 Reid (disambiguation)
 George Read II House, historic home of the son of George Read (signer).
 Read family of Delaware

Notes

English-language surnames
Surnames from nicknames